Spillover: Animal Infections and the Next Human Pandemic is a book written in 2012 by American writer David Quammen. The book, written in narrative form, tells through the personal experiences of the author, who interviewed numerous pathologists and virologists globally to trace the evolution of some of the major pathogens that have affected the human species following a species leap (spillover), a natural process by which an animal pathogen evolves and becomes able to infect, reproduce and transmit within the human species, in a process called zoonosis. Upon its release, Spillover received positive reviews.

Synopsis
In the various chapters of the book, the author dwells on the analysis of a specific pathogen, starting from its discovery and studies on it: the Hendra virus in the first chapter; the Ebola virus in the second; the mathematical study of epidemics at the same time as the spread of malaria in the third; SARS in the fourth; bacterial zoonosis in the fifth chapter (Q fever, psittacosis and Lyme disease); the study of viral transmissibility from animal to man with the case study of herpes B in monkeys and hepadnaviruses from bats in the sixth and seventh chapters; HIV in the eighth chapter and finally some considerations on the evolution of epidemics in relation to the contribution that human activities have in the spread of zoonosis.

Among the human activities, the author identifies some criticisms that increasingly favor the spread of epidemics, including deforestation and the destruction of natural habitats that increase contacts between wild animal species and man, pollution, the overpopulation of some areas that brings millions of people into contact in relatively very confined spaces, the possibility of ever faster and cheaper air travel that favor the possibility of spreading diseases in distant places, and the intensive in contact with billions of animals with the consequent risk of animal epidemics that can be transmitted to humans. All these factors, therefore, in different ways favor the spread of diseases and increase the chances of new future spillovers with pathogens still unknown to the human species but present in nature, just waiting for the right "opportunity" to "make the leap" in humans.

Viruses and pathogens discussed in the book

 Chapter 1: Hendra virus
 Chapter 2: Ebola virus
 Chapter 3: Malaria
 Chapter 4: SARS
 Chapter 5: Bacterial zoonosis - Q fever, psittacosis, and Lyme disease
 Chapter 6: Herpes B
 Chapter 7: Nipah virus 
 Chapter 8: HIV 
 Chapter 9: Nuclear Polyhedrosis Virus

Reception 
Spillover received positive reviews upon its release. Kirkus awarded a star review, praising the accounts on "the thrill of the chase and the derring-do of field research", and described it as "wonderful and eye-opening." Alice Roberts from The Guardian also recommended the book, and praised the recounts on the viruses, the "fascinating" historical details, and the combination of field research with virology, epidemiology and genetics Sonia Shah from The New York Times called it "meaty" and "sprawling", complimenting the descriptions of field trips, and considered the author to be a "cheeky and incisive chronicler of the scientific method". David Williams from Seattle Times also commented positively on the "page turning" engagement, the author highlighting the evolution of zoological diseases and coverage of epidemiologists researching the origins of diseases.

Awards
 The Science and Society Book Award, given by the National Association of Science Writers (2013)
 The Society of Biology (UK) Book Award in General Biology (2013)
 Andrew Carnegie Medals for Excellence in Fiction and Nonfiction (2013)

References

External links 
 'Spillover: Animal Infections and the Next Human Pandemic' Reviewed by Abdul-Kareem Ahmed at NCBI
 
 

Books about diseases
2012 non-fiction books
Zoonoses
W. W. Norton & Company books